Sand Lake is a town in south-central part of Rensselaer County, New York, United States. Sand Lake is about 13 miles east of Albany, New York. Within the town are three hamlets: Averill Park, Glass Lake and the hamlet of Sand Lake. Its four lakes are a source of recreation. Many commercial enterprises of the 19th century and into the 20th century relied on power generated from the Wynants Kill Creek and Burden Lake mills. The area is known for fertile soil for grazing and agriculture. The estimated population for 2016 census was 8,490.

History

Early History 

Sand Lake was first home to Native Americans. In 1629, Kiliaen van Rensselaer acquired a 700,000-acre land grant to establish a Dutch colony, encompassing what later became Sand Lake. Called the Manor of Rensselaerswyck, it was 48 miles across and 24 miles long. In 1664, it became a colony of England and was called the Province of New York. It flipped back to the Dutch in 1672, and returned to the English in 1674.

In the 1750s, Dutch settlers moved into what is now Sand Lake, followed by German pioneers. By 1772, present day Sand Lake was in the Rensselaerwyck District of Albany County. It was held by the English until the Revolutionary War (1775–1783). In 1792, when the town of Rensselaerwyck was divided into two towns, Greenbush and Stephentown. Present day Sand Lake extended into both towns. 

In 1805, the Union Meetinghouse was built for worship by Methodists, Baptists, and Presbyterians. It was the town's oldest public building and was a station on the Underground Railroad.

Town of Sand Lake 
The town of Sand Lake was formed from Greenbush and Berlin from an act of legislature on March 21, 1812 and it was officially made a town on March 1, 1813. Municipal positions were established to be responsible to its citizens, including town clerk, assessors, and more. Calvin Thompson became the first Supervisor. The first postmaster, in 1815, was Daniel M. Gregory. The soil, especially on the eastern lowlands, is fertile for grazing and agriculture, particularly small fruit, strawberries, and other berrys. 

A new church building was established for the Trinity Lutheran Church in 1816. The Zion Evangelical Lutheran Church opened in 1816 at the West Sand Lake site. There were a number of changes in the churches and its membership around the 1830s. The present town borders were established on March 2, 1848 when the town of Sand Lake was divided into towns, Sand Lake and Poestenkill. The town was governed by a supervisor, town clerk and four justices of the peace. Town business was conducted in homes and inns for decades.

There were a number of public and private schools established between 1825 and the early 20th century. A one-room schoolhouse operated in Sand Lake from 1895 until 1929.

In 1866, the Wynantskill Improvement Association created three Burden Lakes from Wynantskill Creek. The lake water turned the Burden water wheel that powered commercial enterprises, like mills, of the Industrial Revolution. 

The Troy and New England Railway provided electric trolley service into Sand Lake from 1895 to 1925. The nine-mile route ran from Albia (of Troy) east to Averill Park. The town's economy grew with tourism and people who became residents during the summer.

Municipal Home Rule Law was enacted in 1964 by the State Legislature, which gave towns greater powers. In 1968, Rensselaer County revised its form of government, replacing the Board of Supervisors with a County Executive and a County Legislature. In 1972, a town hall was established in the former Presbyterian Church. 

The Albert R. Fox House was listed on the National Register of Historic Places in 2001.

Hamlets

Averill Park, Sand Lake, and West Sand Lake are three hamlets within the greater town of Sand Lake.

Averill Park
Averill Park is a hamlet near the center of the town. The Averill post office was established in 1880, with Frank Pettit as first postmaster; the name was changed to Averill Park in 1882. Faith Mills (1829-1966) is one of the textile factories that were established,  starting in the early 19th century, along what is now Burden Lake Road. It was powered with water from the Wynantskill. It is located east of West Sand Lake and has a number of retail businesses, two churches, and the Averill Park High School. The main street has businesses from the mid-19th century.

Sand Lake
Sand Lake is the smallest hamlet of Sand Lake. There are several retail business, the Sand Lake Center for the Arts, a post office, town hall, a tavern, cemetery, and an elementary school. Historic and stately houses are found in Sand Lake, with houses further away from one another than the other two hamlets.

West Sand Lake
West Sand Lake is a hamlet in the northwestern corner of the town. In 1793, Bernhard Uhlein, a soldier of the American Revolutionary War, settled here and established a 325-acre farm. He received the land from a land grant from Patroon VanRensselaer. The settlement was first known as Ulinesville. The post office for was established in 1834, with Frost Myers as postmaster. 

The community became West Sand Lake in 1838. It is the largest of the three hamlets, with the most residents. There are houses dating back to the early 1800s in the western part of the hamlet. It has a number of retail businesses, schools, banks, two churches and a post office.

Other areas
Sand Lake also has populated places named Maple Grove, Sliter's Corner, and Taborton.

Glass Lake 

The Glass Lake area grew up around the Rensselaer Glass Factory that Jeremiah Van Rensselaer founded in 1804. It had homes for 34 workers, a store, school, doctor's office, and more residential and commercial buildings. It is located at Glass Lake, which is the headwaters of the Wynants Kill Creek. A historical marker is located at Routes 43 and 66 at Glass Lake Road.

South Sand Lake
The South Sand Lake post office was established there in 1854, with William Stevens as first postmaster.

Geography
While the surface of the town is undulating in the west, it is quite mountainous in the east, a part of the Rensselaer Plateau. Oak and Perigo hills are about 900 feet above sea level.

Lakes
Within Sand Lake, there are four lakes: Burden Lake, Crooked Lake, Crystal Lake, and Glass Lake. The lakes, stocked with many kinds of fresh water fish, draws tourists to the area. Glass Lake is between Crooked and Crystal Lakes. At 123 acres, it is located in Averill Park and Nassau. Burden Lake is located in the southern part of the town of Sand Lake and is partially in the town of Nassau, it is a total of 369 acres. Crystal Lake, formerly called Sand Lake, is the largest lake in the Averill Park hamlet in the town of Sand Lake. It is 66 acres in size. Crooked Lake is located in the southern part of the town of Sand Lake, south of Glass Lake. It is 113 acres. Wynants Kill is a stream that flows from Crooked Lake, through Glass and Burden Lakes, and drains into both Richard Pond and the Hudson River.

Location

Demographics

As of the census of 2010, there were  8,530 people, 3,009 households, and 2,229 families residing in the town.  The population density was 226.9 people per square mile (87.6/km2).  There were 3,277 housing units at an average density of 93.1 per square mile (35.9/km2).  The racial makeup of the town was 96.4% Non Hispanic White, 0.4% African American, 0.11% Native American, 0.50% Asian and 1.1% from two or more races. Hispanic or Latino origin were 1.5% of the population. Ancestries: German (25.2%), Irish (22.6%), English (14.6%), Italian (13.8%), French (8.9%), Polish (6.1%).

There were 3,009 households, out of which 37.1% had children under the age of 18 living with them, 58.6% were married couples living together, 11.8% had a female householder with no husband present, and 25.9% were non-families. 20.6% of all households were made up of individuals, and 7.9% had someone living alone who was 65 years of age or older.  The average household size was 2.65 and the average family size was 3.08.

In the town, the population was spread out, with 26.6% under the age of 18, 6.1% from 18 to 24, 28.6% from 25 to 44, 28.1% from 45 to 64, and 10.6% who were 65 years of age or older.  The median age was 39 years. For every 100 females, there were 95.7 males.  For every 100 females age 18 and over, there were 93.7 males.

The median income for a household in the town was $77,372, and the median income for a family was $97,009. Males had a median income of $67,132 versus $48,321 for females. The per capita income for the town was $36,103. The Median household income for White households is $75,474 compared to $2,157,374 for Asian households and $223,858 for African American households. About 6.7% of families and 7.7% of the population were below the poverty line, including 6.3% of those under age 18 and 10.3% of those age 65 or over.

Notes

References

Further reading

External links

Municipal Code of Sand Lake
Town of Sand Lake Street Map
Sand Lake Historical Society

Towns in Rensselaer County, New York
1812 establishments in New York (state)